Elections to the Upper House of the Althing were held in Iceland on 15 June 1930. Following reforms in 1915, the six seats in the Upper House appointed by the monarch were abolished, and replaced with six elected seats. The seats were elected by proportional representation at the national level, using the D'Hondt method. The remaining eight seats were elected along with the Lower House. This was the last election solely for the Upper House, as from 1934 onwards all Upper House members were elected together with the Lower House.

Results

References

Elections in Iceland
Iceland
Parliamentary
Iceland